The following events occurred in April 1960:

April 1, 1960 (Friday)
R Griggs & Co. began the production of Dr. Martens boots under licence in the UK. Known as style 1460, the original product is still in production today.
The United States launched the first weather satellite, the  TIROS-1, from Cape Canaveral at  EST. The name was an acronym for Television Infra-Red Observation Satellite. The same evening, satellite weather photos were introduced to the world, on television, for the first time.
The first McDonnell production Mercury spacecraft was delivered to NASA at Wallops Island for the beach-abort test.
The 1960 United States Census began. Officially, there were 179,323,175 United States residents on that day.
Died: Abdul Rahman of Negeri Sembilan, 64, the first Yang di-Pertuan Agong of Malaysia, died in office.

April 2, 1960 (Saturday)
A treaty was signed by France and nationalists in Madagascar, assuring the independence of the Malagasy Republic, which followed in June of the same year.
Yvon Chouinard and Tom Frost opened a new chapter in climbing history by ascending the vertical Kat Pinnacle at Yosemite National Park with a newly designed type of piton.
South African Police at Cape Town stopped several thousand black marchers as they approached the city from the direction of Nyanga.
Sikiru Kayode Adetona was crowned as Ogbagba Anikilaya II, the Awujale of Ijebuland. As of 2012, Adetona was the longest ruling of the traditional Nigeria monarchs.
Born: Linford Christie, Jamaican-born British track athlete who won the 1992 Olympic gold medal and the 1993 world championships in the 100 meter dash; in Saint Andrew Parish, Jamaica

April 3, 1960 (Sunday)
The Charismatic Movement, also referred to as the "Charismatic Renewal", began when Episcopal Priest Dennis Bennett told his congregation at St. Mark's in Van Nuys, California, that he had experienced Spirit baptism accompanied by speaking in tongues. The media soon covered the event as the intrusion of Pentecostalism into a main line church.
Born: Marie Denise Pelletier, Canadian singer, in Montreal 
Died: Norodom Suramarit, 64, King of Cambodia since 1955. He had been preceded by, and was succeeded by, his son Norodom Sihanouk.

April 4, 1960 (Monday)

Elections in Burma resulted in victory for U Nu, who began his third non-consecutive term as prime minister.
Sweden's first three female priests were ordained.
Senegal signed a transfer of power agreement with France, leading up to the country's independence.
At the 32nd Academy Awards ceremony, Ben-Hur won a record eleven Oscars, including Best Picture.
Born: Hugo Weaving, Nigerian-born Australian actor, in Ibadan

April 5, 1960 (Tuesday)
The Space Task Group (STG) notified the Ames Research Center that preliminary planning for the modification of the Mercury spacecraft to accomplish controlled reentry had begun, and Ames was invited to participate in the study. Preliminary specifications for the modified spacecraft were to be ready by the end of the month. This program was later termed Mercury Mark II and eventually Project Gemini.
Preliminary specifications were issued by Space Task Group to modify the Mercury capsule by adding a reentry control navigation system. The modified capsule would obtain a small lifting capability (lift-over-drag ratio would equal approximately 0.26). The self-contained capsule navigation system would consist of a stable platform, a digital computer, a possible star tracker, and the necessary associated electronic equipment. The prospective development called for a prototype to be delivered to NASA for testing in February 1961; and first qualified system, or Modification I, to be delivered by August 1961; and the final qualified system, or Modification II, to be delivered by January 1962. STG anticipated that four navigational systems (not including prototype or qualification units) would be required.
Choosing between two U.S. Senators, voters in Wisconsin overwhelmingly favored John F. Kennedy of Massachusetts over Hubert Humphrey from neighboring Minnesota, by a margin of 478,118 to 372,034 in the first major primary for the Democratic nomination. Vice-President Nixon was unopposed for the Republican nomination.
The name for Oakland, California's new pro football team was announced. The Oakland Señors were renamed the "Raiders" nine days later.
Died: Peter Llewelyn Davies, 63, by suicide. His childhood friend, J. M. Barrie, had identified Davies as the inspiration for the name of Peter Pan.

April 6, 1960 (Wednesday)
The Short SC.1 VTOL aircraft made its first transition from vertical to horizontal flight and back.
Alberto Lleras Camargo, the President of Colombia, addressed a joint session of Congress as part of a 13-day state visit to the United States. Lleras was given a ticker-tape parade in New York on April 11.

April 7, 1960 (Thursday)
In an event described as "unique in world postal history", the governments of 70 nations simultaneously issued stamps to commemorate World Refugee Year.   
Under the Unlawful Organisations Act No 34, the African National Congress and Pan Africanist Congress parties were banned in South Africa. This resulted in the formation of "Umkonto we Sizwe" ("Spear of the Nation"), the guerrilla wing of the ANC, by Nelson Mandela and others.
Ablation tests on nine Mercury heat shield models in the subsonic arc tunnel at the Langley Research Center were completed.

April 8, 1960 (Friday)
West Germany and the Netherlands signed a border agreement to restore land taken during the Dutch annexation of German territory after World War II. Germany agreed to pay DM 280,000,000 for the return of Elten, Selfkant (Zelfkant), and Suderwick (Zuiderwijk) and as reparations (Wiedergutmachung).
Project Ozma, under the direction of astronomer Frank Drake at the National Radio Astronomy Observatory, in Green Bank, West Virginia, commenced and was the first modern Search for extraterrestrial intelligence (SETI) experiment. After detecting nothing from Tau Ceti, Drake steered the telescope toward Epsilon Eridani and picked up signals at precisely eight times per second. As rumors spread that the Project had picked up signs of intelligent life, Drake was forced to say that he had no comment. The source was later traced to an airplane.
Construction of an altitude facility chamber to simulate space environment was completed in Hanger S at Cape Canaveral. The purpose of this facility was for spacecraft checkout and astronaut training. Acceptance tests for this installation were completed on July 11, 1960.

April 9, 1960 (Saturday)
South Africa's Prime Minister Hendrik Verwoerd was shot and seriously wounded by David Pratt, a white farmer, in Johannesburg. Verwoerd survived, but would be stabbed to death in 1966.
The Boston Celtics won the NBA championship, beating the St. Louis Hawks 122–103. The Hawks had forced a seventh game two days earlier by beating Boston 105–102.

April 10, 1960 (Sunday)
The last successful American U-2 overflight of the Soviet Union took place, as a pilot passed near the missile range at Tyuratam. The S-75 Dvina missile batteries that could have downed the plane had not been of the intrusion alerted in time, and several Soviet senior commanders were fired. On May 1, a U-2 plane flown by Francis Gary Powers would be downed.

April 11, 1960 (Monday)
A fisherman in Masan, South Korea, discovered the mutilated body of Kim Chu Yol, a high school student who had been killed during March protests against the fraudulent presidential election. A police tear gas shell was visible in Kim's eye socket, and the outrage against the government's brutality triggered a riot. The violence in Masan was then followed by rioting in other South Korean cities.
Born: Jeremy Clarkson, English television presenter, in Doncaster
Died: Archibald McIndoe, 59, New Zealand plastic surgeon

April 12, 1960 (Tuesday)
Eric Peugeot, the four-year-old grandson of French automotive tycoon Jean-Pierre Peugeot of Peugeot, was kidnapped from a playground at Saint-Cloud, near Paris. Eric was released three days later, in exchange for a ransom of $300,000.
Candlestick Park, described by one source as "the windiest, coldest, and the most hated baseball stadium in the history of the game"  opened at San Francisco, and began a 40-season run as the home of the San Francisco Giants. U.S. Vice-President Richard Nixon (and Republican presidential candidate) threw out the first pitch.
The International Court of Justice, more popularly known as the World Court, resolved a dispute between Portugal and India after more than four years, in Portugal's favor, ruling 11–4 that Portuguese officials could cross over India's territory to reach its colonies in Goa, Daman and Diu. The victory was short-lived, as India annexed all three territories the following year.

April 13, 1960 (Wednesday)
The UK government cancelled the Blue Streak missile.
The United States launched Transit I-B, the first successful navigation satellite, at 7:03 EST from Cape Canaveral. The Transit technology was eventually superseded by Global Positioning System satellites, which were aided by Rudolf E. Kálmán's development, later in the year, of the Kalman filter.

April 14, 1960 (Thursday)
The Montreal Canadiens won the NHL's Stanley Cup, sweeping the Toronto Maple Leafs, four games to zero. In the final game, Montreal won four goals to zero.
Hisamuddin Alam Shah ibni Almarhum Sultan Alaeddin Sulaiman Shah became the second Yang di-Pertuan Agong (Malaysian head of state).
The first underwater launching of the Polaris missile took place, fired from the ballistic submarine USS George Washington, off of the coast of California.
East Germany's Communist SED Communist completed its collectivization drive, designated as Socialist Spring in the Countryside, seizing privately owned farms and businesses to be owned by the State. An exodus of thousands of business owners and farm owners followed.
Bye Bye Birdie, the first Broadway musical to acknowledge rock 'n roll as part of its score, opened at the Martin Beck Theatre, and introduced such songs as Put On A Happy Face. With music and lyrics by Charles Strouse and Lee Adams, the Tony Award winning musical featured Dick Van Dyke, Paul Lynde, Michael J. Pollard, Charles Nelson Reilly, Chita Rivera, Dick Gautier, and others.
Motown Record Corporation was incorporated in Michigan.

April 15, 1960 (Friday)
The Student Nonviolent Coordinating Committee (SNCC) was organized in Raleigh, North Carolina, by 300 students from 58 colleges, who assembled at the invitation of Ella Baker at Shaw University.
Qualification tests began on the Mercury spacecraft posigrade rocket. The first three rocket motors subjected to these tests were successfully tested in a more stringent vibration spectrum than that required for Mercury-Atlas 1 (MA-1), the maximum dynamic reentry and maximum heat on afterbody test flight.
Qualification tests for the Mercury spacecraft retrorockets were started. One of the main purposes of this program was the development of a better igniter. The igniter tested was attached to the head end of the propellant grain and coated with a pyrotechnic. Based on three tests it appeared that the delayed ignition problem had been resolved. Thereafter, several other tests were run until the igniter was adjudged to be reliable.
Born: King Philippe of Belgium, ruler of the Belgians since 2013; at Château de Belvédère, near Laeken

April 16, 1960 (Saturday)
The "New Realism" artistic movement was founded by art critic Pierre Restany with the publication of his Manifeste des Nouveaux Réalistes.
The Sino-Soviet split widened as the Chinese Communist Party journal Red Flag published the editorial Long Live Leninism, an assertion that began with the premise that the Soviet Union had, by pursuing peaceful change, deviated from Lenin's thesis that "so long as imperialism exists, war is inevitable".
Born: 
Rafael Benítez, Spanish football manager, in Madrid 
Wahab Akbar, Filipino politician, in Lantawan, Basilan (d. 2007)

April 17, 1960 (Sunday)
The Russwood Park baseball stadium in Memphis, Tennessee, burned to the ground shortly after a Chicago White Sox vs Cleveland Indians game.
Died: Eddie Cochran, 21, American rock musician who wrote and recorded the classic "Summertime Blues", one day after he, his fiancée Sharon Sheeley, and his fellow musician, Gene Vincent, were seriously injured in a taxi accident. The three Americans were riding through Wiltshire and were in the town of Chippenham when the car blew a tire and crashed into a lamp post. Cochran, who would be inducted into the Rock and Roll Hall of Fame in 1987, would have a posthumous hit with the ironically-titled "Three Steps to Heaven".

April 18, 1960 (Monday)
The European Convention on Extradition took effect, providing uniform rules for all member nations.
Fabrication of the crewed environmental-control-system training spacecraft for Project Mercury was essentially completed and a test program on the equipment was started at McDonnell. This test was completed on April 25, 1960.
The Screen Actors Guild, led by future United States President Ronald Reagan, ended its strike against major movie studios.
Born: 
Neo Rauch, German painter, in Leipzig 
J. Christopher Stevens, U.S Ambassador to Libya who was killed in the 2012 Benghazi attack on the U.S. consulate; in Grass Valley, California

April 19, 1960 (Tuesday)

More than 100,000 students in South Korea marched in Seoul in protest over election fraud committed by President Syngman Rhee in the voting of March 15, beginning the "April Revolution". Police fired into the crowds, killing 140 protesters.
The People's Republic of China struck oil, five days after workers began drilling at Taching (Daqing).

The South West Africa People's Organization (SWAPO) was formed, with Sam Nujoma as its first president, eventually securing independence for Namibia.
Lloyd Aereo Colombiano S.A. (LACSA) Flight 503 crashed on landing in Bogota in Colombia after a multi-stop flight that had originated in Miami.  All but one of the seven-member crew, and 31 of the 44 passengers, were killed.  
The 64th Boston Marathon was won by Paavo Kotila of Finland in 2:20:54.
The first x-ray photograph of the Sun was taken, with a pinhole camera on an Aerobee rocket.
China's Prime Minister Zhou Enlai was welcomed in New Delhi by India's Prime Minister Jawaharlal Nehru to discuss the countries' border dispute, but the talks ended without progress.
Born: Gustavo Petro, Colombian politician, guerrilla fighter and activist, President of Colombia 2022-2026, in Cordoba, Colombia

April 20, 1960 (Wednesday)
Rebels led by General Jose Maria Castro León seized control of the Venezuelan state of Táchira and its capital, San Cristóbal, and attempted unsuccessfully to persuade other military garrisons to revolt against the government of President Rómulo Betancourt. The uprising was quickly put down.
Elvis Presley returned to Hollywood for the first time since his return from military service in Germany, to begin filming G.I. Blues.
From April 20 to 22, the Institute of the Aeronautical Sciences, NASA, and the RAND Corporation sponsored a Manned Space Stations Symposium featuring leading aeronautical and aerospace scientists and engineers from across the country. They examined the entire subject from present planning and future steps through engineering feasibility, operational techniques, designs, costs, and utilitarian considerations. This conference marked one of the focal points in American space station thinking up to that time.

April 21, 1960 (Thursday)
After a week in which 6,000 East Germans fled to West Berlin, several DDR police crossed the border and began searching luggage at railroad stations. West Berlin police arrested two of the DDR police, while others fled. The exodus of thousands came after the East German government "collectivized" private farms and businesses and directed landowners and shopkeepers to become employees of state-owned cooperatives.
The city of Brasilia was dedicated by President Juscelino Kubitschek, three years after he had directed construction to begin on a new capital city for Brazil.

April 22, 1960 (Friday)
The crash of a Belgian DC-4 airliner into a mountainside in Congo killed all 28 passengers and seven crew. The flight had originated in Brussels the night before, with a final destination of Lubumbashi (at the time, called Elisabethville) with stops at Rome, Cairo and Bunia. The plane descended for its approach to Bunia through low clouds and impacted a peak in the Virunga Mountains.  
France's President Charles De Gaulle was given an enthusiastic welcome by 200,000 people upon his arrival in Washington, D.C., on the fifth day of his tour of the Western Hemisphere. President De Gaulle spoke to a joint session of Congress on April 25, urging nuclear disarmament, and was cheered by more than a million people the next day at a ticker-tape parade in New York.
Born: 
Gary Rhodes, English celebrity chef, in London (d. 2019)
Mart Laar, Prime Minister of Estonia 1992-1994 and 1999-2002; in Viljandi

April 23, 1960 (Saturday)
Researcher Tim Dinsdale brought his 16 millimeter movie camera to capture what many believe to be the only film of the Loch Ness Monster.
Born: Valerie Bertinelli, American actress (One Day At a Time), weight-loss spokesperson, and one-time wife of Eddie Van Halen; in Wilmington, Delaware.

April 24, 1960 (Sunday)
One of the first widely publicized stories of hysterical strength happened in Tampa, Florida, when Mrs. Florence Rogers, a  woman, lifted one end of a  car that had fallen off of a jack and onto her 16-year-old son, Charles Trotter. Mrs. Rogers, an LPN, fractured several vertebrae in the process.
When more than 100 black protesters marched on to a "whites only" beach in Biloxi, Mississippi, for a "wade-in" to force desegregation, they were attacked by several hundred white people, while Harrison County sheriff's deputies at the scene stood by. The violence then spilled over into the most violent riot in Mississippi history. A U.S. Department of Justice suit ended beach segregation the following month.
A fraudulent parliamentary election in Laos resulted in a landslide victory for the ruling CDNI Party.
Died: Max von Laue, 80, German physicist and Nobel Prize laureate, 16 days after his car was struck by a motorcyclist.

April 25, 1960 (Monday)
The USS Triton (SSRN-586) completed the first submerged circumnavigation of the globe.
Died: Amānullāh Khān, 67, King of Afghanistan from 1919 to 1929, died 31 years after his forced abdication

April 26, 1960 (Tuesday)

Syngman Rhee resigned as President of South Korea after 12 years of dictatorial rule, after a week-long uprising in which 145 students had died. Rhee and his wife were flown out of the country by the United States, and he lived in exile in Hawaii until his death in 1965. Until a new President could be elected, Rhee was replaced in the interim by a former Mayor of Seoul, Heo Jeong.
The "Manifesto of the Eighteen" was published in Saigon.
Tests were completed on the maximum altitude sensor for the Mercury spacecraft. This component was fabricated by the Donner Scientific Company.
Born: Affectionately, thoroughbred racehorse and one of only two female horses to earn more than half a million dollars in prize winnings. Between 1962 and 1965, she would win 18 major stakes races, and would later be inducted into the National Museum of Racing and Hall of Fame (d. 1979)

April 27, 1960 (Wednesday)

The West African country of French Togoland, a UN trust territory, became independent, as the Togolese Republic was proclaimed at  local (and GMT) in Lomé. Sylvanus Olympio became the new nation's first President. The symbolic first raising of the new flag was confounded by tangled ropes and the problem was not resolved until later in the hour.
The Ghanaian constitutional referendum resulted in a vote in favour of replacing the constitutional monarchy with a republic led by a president.
USS Tullibee (SSN-597), the first nuclear-powered electric-drive submarine, was launched from Groton, Connecticut.
Various gamma ray detectors were carried aboard Explorer XI on its orbital flight. These detectors found a directional flux of gamma radiation in space and thereby provided serious evidence against one formulation of the "steady state" cosmological theory.

April 28, 1960 (Thursday)
The construction of what would become Shea Stadium, at Flushing, Queens, was approved by New York City's Board of Estimate, 20–2, giving the proposed Continental League the chance to launch. The Continental League never played, but the stadium gave the National League the impetus to return to the city, with the New York Mets.
Born: 
Ian Rankin, Scottish crime novelist, in Cardenden, Fife 
Walter Zenga, Italian footballer and football manager, in Milan
Died: Lee Ki-poong, former Vice-President of South Korea, died along with his wife and two sons as part of a suicide pact. Lee, and President Syngman Rhee, had resigned two days earlier in the wake of the April Revolution.

April 29, 1960 (Friday)
Italy's new government, led by Fernando Tambroni of the Christian Democrats, narrowly won a vote of confidence, 128–110, in the Italian Senate. Tambroni had quit on April 11, shortly after taking office.
Agreements, either interim or final, were concluded for all overseas Mercury tracking stations as of this date. Construction was proceeding on schedule at Cape Canaveral, Bermuda, Grand Canary Island, the Woomera and Muchea Australian sites, and at the demonstration site on Wallops Island, Virginia. The survey of Guaymas in Western Mexico completed that phase of the program, but the construction was yet to be accomplished.

April 30, 1960 (Saturday)
Thousands of Paraguayan rebels crossed the Paraná River, Paraguay's southern border with Argentina, seeking to overthrow the government of dictator Alfredo Stroessner.
Born: David Miscavige, American Scientologist leader, in Philadelphia

References

1960
1960-04
1960-04